Martyn Madden (born 4 December 1973 in Cardiff) is a Welsh former rugby union player. Madden made his debut for the Wales national team on 8 June 2002 against the Springboks. A prop forward, he played club rugby for Llanelli Scarlets.

Notes 

1973 births
Scarlets players
Welsh rugby union players
Wales international rugby union players
Living people
Rugby union players from Cardiff
Rugby union props